Annamaria is a feminine given name. Notable people with the name include:

Annamaria Baudena (born 1963), Italian ski mountaineer
Annamaria Cancellieri (born 1943), Italian politician
Annamaria Lusardi, Italian economist
Annamaria Mazzetti (born 1988), Italian triathlete
Annamaria Orla-Bukowska, Polish anthropologist
Annamaria Prezelj (born 1997), Slovenian women's basketball player
Annamaria Quaranta (born 1981), Italian volleyball player
Annamaria Solazzi (born 1965), Italian beach volleyball player

Annamaria is a Hungarian, Italian & many other countries' name.

See also
Anna Maria (disambiguation)
Anamaria
Ana María (1929–1983), Salvadoran revolutionary

Italian feminine given names